The fourth season of The Voice Kids is a Philippine reality singing competition on ABS-CBN. Lea Salonga and Bamboo Mañalac reprised their roles as coaches, while Sarah Geronimo returned as a coach for the fourth season, replacing Sharon Cuneta who left the show to focus on her other projects.

The show premiered on August 3, 2019, on ABS-CBN, replacing Idol Philippines. Vanjoss Bayaban of Team Sarah won the competition, making Sarah Geronimo's second win as coach.

In November 2022, The Voice Kids is renewed for a fifth season to premiere in 2023.

Changes

Coaches
In an interview on June 3, 2019, it was confirmed that Sarah Geronimo will return as a coach for the fourth season, replacing Sharon Cuneta who left the show to focus on her other projects. In her post in early July 2019, Lea Salonga confirmed herself that she will return to the show for her fourth season (her overall seventh season in all Philippine versions of The Voice). Bamboo Mañalac will also return to the show as well.

Hosts
Toni Gonzaga hosted the fourth season replacing Luis Manzano, who has hosting duties with Minute to Win It: Last Man Standing and the second season of I Can See Your Voice. Robi Domingo returned as the show's backstage host. Kim Chiu did not return as the show's backstage host to focus on her upcoming drama series Love Thy Woman.

Companion show
An online show, called The Voice Kids DigiTV, airs together with the main program on The Voice of the Philippines Facebook and YouTube accounts; it is hosted by comedian impersonator Jervi Li, commonly known as KaladKaren Davila and Jeremy Glinoga of the first season of The Voice Teens. Every episode, a guest co-host is invited more particularly those previous contestants of the previous seasons such as Lyca Gairanod and Elha Nympha.

Mechanics
In a report on TV Patrol last July 4, 2019, each coach has the power to decide their team sizes, making the first season of the Philippine version to have such change (with the first six versions having team limits). Alongside this new change is the addition of "steals", making the third kids version around the world to adopt this rule (the first one was on the fifth season of the Vietnamese version and the second one was on the fifth season of the German version).

Teams

Blind auditions
Taping for the blind auditions started on June 27, 2019. Each coach can have an unlimited number of artists in their team. The first episode aired on August 3.

Starting on August 11, 2019, all Sunday episodes aired from 7:45pm to 9:00pm.

Episode 1 (August 3)
The first episode was graced by an opening number from the three coaches, along with the Payatas Kids Choir, wherein they sang "Can't Stop the Feeling!" of Justin Timberlake.

Episode 2 (August 4)

Episode 3 (August 10)

Episode 4 (August 11)

Episode 5 (August 17)

Episode 6 (August 18)

Episode 7 (August 24)

Episode 8 (August 25)

Episode 9 (August 31)

Episode 10 (September 1)

Episode 11 (September 7)

Episode 12 (September 8)

Episode 13 (September 14)

Episode 14 (September 15)

Episode 15 (September 21)

The Battles
Each coach is tied with 17 artists in each team. The coaches will pit their artists in trios or quartets for the Battles. The power to steal an artist from other teams is implemented during this season. Each coach is allowed to steal one losing artist from opposing coaches. Artists who win their battle or were stolen by another coach advances to the Sing-offs.

The first episode of the battles aired on September 22, 2019.

Color key

The Sing-offs
Artists who won their battle or were stolen by another coach advances to the Sing-Offs. This part of the competition follows the format of the previous season wherein remaining artists pit for one of the three spots per team in the Live Shows.

Color key

Semifinals 
The Semifinals was held in Newport Performing Arts Theater, Resorts World Manila, Newport City, Pasay.

This season follows the rules of the previous season except that the finalists of each team will be selected by the coaches themselves, as the semifinals were prerecorded, featuring no interactive viewer voting component, and therefore no subsequent results shows. The top three artists (one per team) coming from the selection of the coaches. will advance to the Finals.

Color key:

Live Finals 
The Live Grand Finals was held in the Newport Performing Arts Theater, Resorts World Manila, Newport City, Pasay.

There are three rounds – Duet with the Coaches, Upbeat Showstopper, and Power Ballad. The first night has first two rounds, while the second night has the third round and the announcement of results.

With the victory of Vanjoss Bayaban, he is the first 3-chair turn artist to win the Voice Kids, and the second win of Sarah Geronimo as coach (fourth win in all editions of The Voice, and second consecutive win–continuing her streak from The Voice Teens). Coincidentally, Cyd Pangca is the second artist who returned to The Voice Kids that advanced to the finals (and also place third).

Color Key

Notable artists
The following are the artists who had appeared in other reality shows, or had performed or had competed in other various non-televised competitions:
 Ian Joseph Prelligera appeared on the third season, gaining 3-chair turns and joined Team Sharon. He was eliminated in the Sing-offs. He is the second artist to reappear on The Voice Kids, after Justin Alva.
 Renz Aleguiojo joined the World Championship of Performing Arts wherein he placed as a division winner.
 Cyd Pangca appeared on the third season and joined Team Sharon by default. He was eliminated in the Battles. He is the third artist to reappear on The Voice Kids.
 Pica Mabitag joined Tawag ng Tanghalan Kids.
 Gaea Salipot is the Grand Winner of SM Little Stars 2017. She also joined the World Championships of Performing Arts in 2018 where she placed Champion of the World Division Winner.
 Kaycee David and Keino Encelan, who both failed to advance in the battles, appeared in the children's television show Team Yey! as one of its hosts, with Kaycee appeared on the fourth season, and Keino later appeared on its fifth season. Keino also later appeared in the TV show Dream Maker as one of the Top 62 Dream Chasers, under the screen name Prince Encelan. He was eliminated in the final episode and finished in Rank 9 of the overall individual ranking.

Television ratings
Television ratings for the fourth season of The Voice Kids on ABS-CBN were gathered from Kantar Media, where its survey ratings are gathered from urban and rural households all over the Philippines.

References

External links
 The Voice Kids (season 4) Official website

The Voice of the Philippines
The Voice Kids (Philippine TV series)
2019 Philippine television seasons